Beam Me Up Scotty is the third mixtape by rapper Nicki Minaj. It was released on April 18, 2009. The mixtape features guest verses from rappers Brinx, Busta Rhymes, Drake, Gucci Mane, Mack Maine, Gudda Gudda, Jae Millz, Lil Wayne, Red Café, Rocko and Ron Browz, as well as vocals from singers Ricky Blaze, Bobby V, Shanell. Its production was overseen by DJ Holiday and The Trap-a-Holics.

The mixtape received favorable reviews from music critics, and is also largely credited with establishing Minaj's fan base. Minaj reissued Beam Me Up Scotty on May 14, 2021, released by Republic Records. The reissue debuted at number two on the Billboard 200, making it the highest charting mixtape and the highest debuting female rap mixtape.

Background
Beam Me Up Scotty was recorded after Lil Wayne noticed Minaj's appearance on Queens-based underground rap label Dirty Money Records on "The Come Up" DVD series. He is credited with mentoring Minaj as she recorded Beam Me Up Scotty, two years after her appearance on "Don't Stop, Won't Stop", a track from Wayne's acclaimed 2007 mixtape. Da Drought 3 that sampled "Can't Stop, Won't Stop" by Young Gunz. Minaj says of her time on tour with Lil Wayne: "It made me hungry. That's what inspired me and the music for the Beam Me Up Scotty tape — the I Am Music Tour."

Minaj credits Beam Me Up Scotty with re-focusing her on her music at a time when much of her career efforts were associated with her image:

Promotion
A music video for the song "Itty Bitty Piggy" was released for the song due to popular demand. The video is shots of Nicki performing the song live at a club concert and behind the scenes of the Beam Me Up Scotty photo shoot. The video was premiered on Hoodaffairs on Demand who also had a part in shooting the clip. "Go Hard", featuring Lil Wayne, was promoted with a music video shot by director Koach K. Rich.

Critical reception

Beam Me Up Scotty was well received by critics and fans alike receiving an average score of 78. MTV's Mixtape Daily chose Beam Me Up Scotty as its weekly pick on May 4, 2009, giving the album positive reviews: "Yeah, you are going to hear a bunch of more-than-just-friendly shout-outs to the ladies – Nicki says she loves the girls and has no problem surrounding herself with "bad bitches." Mixtape Daily favored tracks such as "I Get Crazy", "Kill the DJ" & "Envy". Beam Me Up Scotty is credited with helping distinguish Minaj as a popular female figure in a male-dominated genre.

BET.com's SoundOff TV gave Minaj a positive review on her mixtape while commenting on impressions of Minaj herself: "I’m not going to front, when Nicki first hit my 'new rapper radar' I immediately hit the 'I’ll pass' button since the parallels between her and Lil' Kim were extremely similar. Dark skin thick girl rapping about explicit issues we only talk about behind closed doors – yeah, I’d say she was a carbon copy. But after removing the stubborn sticker from my forehead, I sat down and dissected shorty’s material and the parallels didn’t exist like I once thought."

Writing for MSN Music in 2011, critic Robert Christgau identified Beam Me Up Scotty as the release that convinced "hards" that Minaj "was street enough", noting her "highly unsisterly, rabidly materialistic" persona on the mixtape. According to Rob Molster of The Cavalier Daily, Beam Me Up Scotty "garnered [Minaj] a reputation for delivering vicious lyrics with a fresh style...[and] also revealed Minaj to have a knack for invoking alternative personalities, adding another layer to her already complex persona." The recording is credited with helping to create Minaj's fanbase. Shortly after its release, Minaj, along with other Cash Money/Young Money artists, appeared on MTV.com's Mixtape Daily to discuss the recording.

Retrospective analysis

In a 2021 review of the mixtape's reissue, The Daily Californian writer Kelly Nguyen noted that back in 2009 when the tape was first released, "Minaj’s rise as ruler of rap was sensational" and that her "clear talent was matched with her copious charisma — all wrapped up in the bait-and-switch of her personas". She added that the "nostalgia of Minaj's throwback mixtape is the reason why the album’s release reignited Barbz and TikTok youth to stream it". She went on to say that beginning from this album,"[Minaj went] full throttle into a vertiginous verse that's built to make you feel like a Barbie-level boss. But then she’s casual and carefree [...] It’s how she’s stayed relevant since the age of Justin Bieber prepuberty bowl cuts and Kanye's MTV VMA coup d’état. As much as the world tried to pare her down to its level, she chewed it up and spit it out, just to repeat the process on the next verse".
Complex writer Trace William Cowen also noted that "fans and industry watchers alike have pointed to the unique circumstances surrounding" the album's number two debut, "commending Minaj for bagging such a strong opening week with a project that's effectively (new cuts aside) a little over 12 years old". In an analysis of the reissue, PopMatters writer Ana Clara Ribeiro stated that "Minaj might not have been a pioneer of women in rap" but it also does not "make sense anymore to describe her as a 'female rapper' when she is one of the best alive and a serious candidate to best of all time". Rolling Stone writer Mankaprr Conteh stated that with the re-release, Minaj revisited a "distant golden age". He went on to say that Minaj's ascent with the mixtape "came as rap made by women seemed to be on the decline. The number of women signed to major labels reportedly went from more than 40 to just three between the late eighties and 2010; after her arrival, Minaj became a singular figure in music for almost a decade". He went on to say that this mixtape "paved the way for that accomplishment". On the mixtape content, he stated Minaj "brought a more down to earth humanity to her persona with revealing spoken interludes". Conteh went on to say that,
"Twelve years after Beam Me Up Scotty, there are many more women making popular rap music and there’s no doubt that Nicki Minaj's success has inspired the variety and competition that exists now [...] Women across rap explore the contours of their voices, building on a framework established by [Minaj]. They complement their raps with delicate singing. They have tapped into her over-the-top wardrobe and wigs. Many came up remaking [Minaj's] songs and at their most fortunate, they’ve been able to collaborate with her".

Commercial performance
In 2009, "I Get Crazy", featuring Lil Wayne, charted on the US Hot Rap Songs and Hot R&B/Hip-Hop Songs charts, at numbers 20 and 37 respectively, due to heavy airplay. Upon reissuing, the mixtape debuted at number two on the Billboard 200 selling over 80,000 copies in its first week. The mixtape became the "highest-charting re-released mixtape by a rapper and the highest-debuting female rap mixtape in history". The opening track of the reissue, "Seeing Green" with Drake and Lil Wayne debuted at number 12 on the Billboard Hot 100 and ranked as the week's best-selling song in pure sales. The 2021 re-release also made Minaj surpass Janet Jackson as the female artist with the second most top 10 singles on the Hot R&B/Hip-Hop Songs chart with "Seeing Green" debuting at number 8 without being officially released as a single.

Track listing

2021 reissue

Background
On May 11, 2021 after a three month hiatus from social media, Minaj shared a series of pictures on Instagram teasing the release of music on Friday, May 14th. She confirmed the release of music on Instagram Live confirming that Beam Me Up Scotty would be released "on major streaming services, and would include a fresh track" called "Seeing Green" featuring rappers Drake and Lil Wayne. Drake also joined the broadcast saying,
"It didn't feel right, you not being on it. Nobody does this shit better than you. We miss your presence, we miss your bars". On May 14, 2021, Minaj re-released the mixtape on all streaming services along with a new cover and three new songs. Billboard described the new mixtape artwork as Minaj going "full-retro for the revamped Star Trek-themed artwork". 

In 2021, as she teased the reissue of the mixtape, Minaj posted a picture of herself wearing hot pink Croc shoes. According to Billboard and The Sole Supplier, "the look caused a whopping 4,900% spike in sales of pink Crocs and the retailer's website also crashed."

Content
In addition to "Seeing Green", the reissue includes two new tracks titled "Fractions" and a remix of "Crocodile Teeth" with Skillibeng. The mixtape also included her 2014 tracks "Chi-Raq" and "Boss Ass Bitch" with G Herbo and PTAF respectively. The 2009 mixtape was also included but several tracks did not make the final cut due to sampling issues including: "I Feel Free," "Mind on My Money," "Handstand," "Five-O" and "Outro."

Track listing

Personnel
Credits adapted from the back cover of Beam Me Up Scotty.
 Debra Antney – executive producer
 Onika Maraj – executive producer
 waeone@aol.com – cover art

Charts

Weekly charts

Year-end charts

Release history

References

2009 mixtape albums
Albums produced by Ron Browz
Nicki Minaj albums